The Spain cricket team toured Finland in August 2019 to play a three-match Twenty20 International (T20I) series. These matches had T20I status after the International Cricket Council announced that all matches played between Associate Members after 1 January 2019 would have full T20I status. These were the first T20I matches to be played in Finland. In February 2019, Cricket Finland and Cricket España announced that the series would be hosted at the Kerava National Cricket Ground in August 2019, with Spain agreeing to host a return series against Finland in Spring 2020.

After the first day of the T20I series, the teams were tied at one win apiece. Finland recorded their first T20I victory in the opening match by a comfortable 82-run margin, before Spain levelled the series with a 6-wicket win in the second match. On the second day, Spain won the deciding match  with a successful run chase to seal a 4-wicket victory to win the series 2–1.

Squads

Tour match

20-over match: Finland Development XI vs Spain XI

T20I series

1st T20I

2nd T20I

3rd T20I

References

External links
 Series home at ESPN Cricinfo

Cricket in Spain
Cricket in Finland
Associate international cricket competitions in 2019